Sludnaya is a rural locality (a village) in Verkhovskoye Rural Settlement, Verkhovazhsky District, Vologda Oblast, Russia. The population was 119 as of 2002.

Geography 
Sludnaya is located 42 km southwest of Verkhovazhye (the district's administrative centre) by road. Srednyaya is the nearest rural locality.

References 

Rural localities in Verkhovazhsky District